Heinz Flotho (23 February 1915 – 29 January 2000) was a German international footballer.

References

1915 births
2000 deaths
Association football goalkeepers
German footballers
Germany international footballers
VfL Osnabrück players